{{Infobox station
| name = Kohoku Station
| style = JR East
| native_name = 湖北駅
| native_name_lang = ja
| type = 
| image = Kohoku-Sta-N(cropped).jpg
| alt = 
| caption = Kohoku Station north exit in July 2018
| other_name = 
| address = Nakazato 324, Abiko-shi, Chiba-ken 270-1122
| country = Japan
| coordinates = 
| operator =  JR East
| line =   Narita Line
| distance = 6.3 km from 
| platforms = 1 island platform
| tracks = 
| connections = 
| structure = 
| code = 
| status = Staffed ('Midori no Madoguchi )
| website = 
| opened = April 1, 1901
| closed = 
| former = 
| passengers = 3987 daily
| pass_year = 2019
| map_type = Japan Chiba Prefecture#Japan
| map_dot_label = Kohoku Station
| services = 
}} 
 is a passenger railway station in the city of Abiko, Chiba Prefecture Japan, operated by the East Japan Railway Company (JR East).

Lines
Kohoku Station is served by the Abiko Branch Line of the Narita Line, and is located 6.3 kilometers from the terminus of branch line at Abiko Station.

Station layout
Kohoku Station is an elevated station with a single island platform. The station building is built on a cantilever above and across the platform. The station has a Midori no Madoguchi'' staffed ticket office.

Platforms

History
Kohoku Station was opened on April 1, 1901 as a station on the Narita Railway Company. On September 1, 1920, the Narita Railway was nationalised, becoming part of the Japanese Government Railways (JGR).  After World War II, the JGR became the Japanese National Railways (JNR). Scheduled freight operations were suspended from November 1, 1962. The station was absorbed into the JR East network upon the privatization of the Japanese National Railways on April 1, 1987. The station building was extensively rebuilt and modernized in 2007.

Passenger statistics
In fiscal 2019, the station was used by an average of 3987 passengers daily.

Surrounding area
 
 Kohoku Housing District

See also
 List of railway stations in Japan

References

External links

JR East station information 

Railway stations in Japan opened in 1901
Railway stations in Chiba Prefecture
Narita Line
Abiko, Chiba